Clairvaux may refer to:

Places
Clairvaux-d'Aveyron, a commune in the Aveyron department in southern France 
Clairvaux-les-Lacs, a commune in the Jura department of France
Lacs de Clairvaux, two lakes located in Clairvaux-les-Lacs
Scorbé-Clairvaux, a commune in the Vienne department in the Nouvelle-Aquitaine region of western France
Clairvaux, a former commune in France, now part of Ville-sous-la-Ferté
Clairvaux Abbey, a former Cistercian site
Clairvaux Prison, built on the site of the abbey
Clairvaux MacKillop College in Brisbane, Australia
Abbey of New Clairvaux, a rural Trappist monastery in northern California
Mount Clairvaux, a mountain on the Continental Divide and the boundary of British Columbia and Alberta, Canada

People
Alcher of Clairvaux, atwelfth-century monk of Clairvaux
Geoffrey of Clairvaux, Bernard's secretary and biographer
Nicholas of Clairvaux
Saint Bernard of Clairvaux, the most famous abbot
Gerard of Clairvaux (died 1138), Bernard's older brother
Gerard of Clairvaux (died 1177), abbot of Clairvaux, the first Cistercian martyr

Arts, media, and entertainment
 Chapters 29-32 of James Rollins' sixth Sigma Force novel, The Doomsday Key, are named "Clairvaux, France", as the city Clairvaux in Ville-sous-la-Ferte, Clairvaux Abbey, and Cairvaux Prison play major roles in the plot